The Canton of Bonnat is a canton situated in the Creuse département and in the Nouvelle-Aquitaine region of central France.

Geography 
An area of farming, quarrying and forestry in the arrondissement of Guéret, centred on the town of Bonnat. The altitude varies from 210m (Nouzerolles) to 515m (Bonnat) with an average altitude of 332m.

Population

Composition 
At the French canton reorganisation which came into effect in March 2015, the canton was expanded from 13 to 18 communes (2 of which were merged into the new commune Linard-Malval):
 
Bonnat
Le Bourg-d'Hem
La Cellette
Chambon-Sainte-Croix
Champsanglard
Châtelus-Malvaleix
Chéniers
La Forêt-du-Temple
Genouillac
Linard-Malval
Lourdoueix-Saint-Pierre
Méasnes
Mortroux
Moutier-Malcard 
Nouziers
Roches
Saint-Dizier-les-Domaines

See also 
 Arrondissements of the Creuse department
 Cantons of the Creuse department
 Communes of the Creuse department

References

Bonnat